Microglossum is a genus of fungi in the family Leotiaceae. Ascocarps (fruit bodies) occur in soil and resemble earth tongues, but are microscopically distinct. Microglossum atropurpureum, a species typical of waxcap grassland in Europe, is of global conservation concern and is listed as "vulnerable" on the IUCN Red List of Threatened Species.

Species
Microglossum atropurpureum
Microglossum atrovirens
Microglossum capitatum
Microglossum cinnamomeum
Microglossum clavatum
Microglossum contortum
Microglossum fechtneri
Microglossum fumosum
Microglossum griseoviride
Microglossum jaczewskii
Microglossum longisporum
Microglossum nudipes
Microglossum obscurum
Microglossum olivaceisquamulosum
Microglossum olivaceum
Microglossum partitium
Microglossum parvisporum
Microglossum pratense
Microglossum rickii
Microglossum rufescens
Microglossum rufum
Microglossum tenebrosum
Microglossum tetrasporum
Microglossum truncatum
Microglossum viride

References

External links

Ascomycota genera
Taxa described in 1879
Taxa named by Claude Casimir Gillet